The National Cyber Force (NCF) is intended to consolidate offensive cyber activity in the United Kingdom, by enabling an offensive capability to combat security threats, hostile states, terror groups, extremism, hackers, disinformation and election interference.

Organisation 
The specialist unit is a joint initiative between the Ministry of Defence (MOD) and GCHQ, one of the British intelligence agencies. 

Around £76m will be invested in the NCF in its first year. 

It will operate alongside the National Cyber Security Centre (NCSC), which primarily concentrates on defensive cyber activities to protect government departments, strategic infrastructure and industry.

History
Plans for the unit were reported in the media in September 2018. It has since been reported to have been delayed because of "distractions caused by uncertainties over Brexit and frequent changes of ministers and secretaries of state in the MoD" and turf wars between the MOD and GCHQ.

An April 2021 report produced by academics from King's College London and the Offensive Cyber Working Group has produced a set of recommendations for the NCF, with an aim to increase public debate on offensive cyber in the UK.

In October 2021 it was announced that the NCF will be based in the village of Samlesbury, as part of a new 'cyber corridor'.

See also
UK cyber security community
Joint Operations Cell
Joint Threat Research Intelligence Group
National Cyber Crime Unit
United States Cyber Command

References

Hacker groups
Hacking (computer security)
GCHQ operations
Ministry of Defence (United Kingdom)